Russell W. "Russ" Meyer Jr. (born 1932 in Davenport, Iowa, United States) is the Chairman Emeritus and former Chief Executive Officer (CEO) of the Cessna Aircraft Company. He was awarded the Wright Brothers Memorial Trophy, the Collier Trophy on two separate occasions (once jointly with Cessna), and the Meritorious Service Award from the National Business Aircraft Association (NBAA). In 2009, he became inducted into the National Aviation Hall of Fame.

Meyer graduated from Yale University with a B.A. degree in 1954 and was awarded a Doctor of Law degree from Harvard Law School in 1961.

He was a jet pilot in the U.S. Air Force from 1955-1958 and served with the Marine Corps Reserves from 1958–1961.

Between 1961 and 1966, Meyer was an attorney with Arter & Hadden in Cleveland, Ohio. He was President and CEO of the Grumman American Aviation Corporation from 1966 to 1974, and joined Cessna in 1974 as an Executive Vice President, recruited by long-time Cessna President Dwane Wallace. Meyer was elected the company's CEO in 1975 by Wallace and the rest of the Board of Directors, and would serve in that role from 1975 to 2000 and again from June 2002 to 2004, succeeded by Jack J. Pelton.

He conceived the Citation Special Olympics Airlift in 1986, which uses Cessna Citation Jets to transport thousands of disabled athletes to the National Special Olympics. That same year, he and Cessna were awarded the Collier Trophy for the worldwide safety record of the Cessna Citation fleet of business jets. Ten years later, in 1996, under his leadership, the Collier Trophy was again awarded to Cessna for developing the Citation X, the first commercial aircraft to achieve a cruising speed of Mach .92, making it the fastest business jet in the world. Meyer also helped lead the passage of the 1994 General Aviation Revitalization Act, and was involved in various programs throughout his career that aimed at growing and strengthening the aviation industry.

He was a close and longtime friend of legendary golfer, pilot and Cessna owner Arnold Palmer.

He and his wife Helen have five children.

References

External links
 Russell W. Meyer, Jr. Chairman Emeritus, Cessna Aircraft Company - Wichita Aero Club

1932 births
Living people
Yale University alumni
Harvard Law School alumni
Collier Trophy recipients
National Aviation Hall of Fame inductees
People from Davenport, Iowa
American aviation businesspeople
American aerospace businesspeople
Cessna
United States Army Air Forces pilots
Military personnel from Iowa